George Shelley may refer to:

 George Shelley (singer) (born 1993), former member of Union J
 George M. Shelley (1849–1927), mayor of Kansas City, Missouri, 1878–1879
 George Ernest Shelley (1840–1910), English geologist and ornithologist
 George Shelley (soldier and adventurer), from New Zealand, volunteered in the 1948 Arab–Israeli War